Beytüşşebap District is a district of the Şırnak Province of Turkey. In 2021, the district had a population of 15,636. The seat of the district is the town of Beytüşşebap.

Settlements 
Beytüşşebap District contains no beldes, thirty-one villages of which five are unpopulated and moreover fifty-five hamlets.

Villages 

 Akarsu
 Akçayol
 Aşağıdere
 Ayvalık
 Başaran
 Beşağaç
 Boğazören
 Bolağaç
 Bölücek
 Cevizağacı
 Çığlıca
 Dağaltı
 Dilekyolu
 Doğanyol
 Dönmezler
 Gökçe
 Güneyyaka
 Günyüzü
 Ilıcak
 Kovankaya
 Koyunoba
 Mezraa
 Mutluca
 Ortalı
 Oymakaya
 Pirinçli
 Söğütce
 Toptepe
 Tuzluca
 Yenice
 Yeşilöz

References 

Districts of Şırnak Province
States and territories established in 1990